Ismaël Bennacer (born 1 December 1997) is a professional footballer who plays as a midfielder for  club AC Milan. Born in France, he represents the Algeria national team.

At club level, Bennacer has represented teams in France, England and Italy throughout his career. At international level, he made his senior debut for Algeria in 2016, and has since represented his nation at three editions of the Africa Cup of Nations; he was a member of the team that won the 2019 edition, and was named the player of the tournament.

Club career

Early career
After starting his career with French club Arles, Bennacer signed for Premier League side Arsenal in July 2015. He made his senior Arsenal debut in the League Cup fourth round away to Sheffield Wednesday on 27 October 2015, replacing Theo Walcott after 19 minutes, after the latter had already replaced the injured Alex Oxlade-Chamberlain in an eventual 3–0 loss.

On 31 January 2017, it was announced that Bennacer would join Ligue 2 side Tours on loan for the remainder of the 2016–17 season. He scored his first goal for Tours on 14 April 2017 against Sochaux from a free kick.

On 21 August 2017, Bennacer joined Italian club Empoli. In the 2017–18 Serie B season, Bennacer made 39 appearances and scored 2 goals as Empoli won the Serie B title, earning promotion to Serie A. Despite Empoli's relegation the following season, Bennacer's performances confirmed his status as one of the most promising young midfielders in Europe.

AC Milan

2019–20 season 
On 4 August 2019, AC Milan announced they had signed Bennacer from Empoli for a reported transfer fee of €16 million plus bonuses. He underwent his medical on 23 July and signed a five-year contract, with a reported salary of €1.5 million per season. He made his club debut on 25 August, coming on as a second–half substitute in a 1–0 away defeat to Udinese in Serie A; his home and full–debut came on 31 August, in a 1–0 victory over Brescia. On 18 July 2020, he scored his first goal for the club and in the Italian top flight in a 5–1 home win over Bologna in Serie A.

2020–21 season 
Bennacer played 30 matches in all competitions, helping Milan to finish second in league table.

2021–22 season 
Already a regular on Pioli's side, Bennacer form generated much praise from Italian pundits, showing dominating performance against the likes of Inter and Napoli.

On 23 October 2021, as Milan was drawing 2–2 against Bologna, Bennacer scored the third goal in an eventual 4–2 win. On 19 March 2022, Bennacer scored a screamer from outside the box against Cagliari, helping his team to win 1–0 and stay on the top of league table. For the first time in a single Serie A season, Bennacer has scored more than once. Bennacer won the league title with AC Milan on 22 May 2022 with a 0-3 win at U.S. Sassuolo Calcio. It was his first trophy with the club.

2022-23 season 
On 12 January 2023, Bennacer extended his contract until 30 June 2027.

International career
Although he had previously represented France at youth level, on 31 July 2016, the Algerian Football Federation announced that Bennacer had opted to switch his international allegiance and represent Algeria internationally. He debuted for the Algeria national team in a 2017 Africa Cup of Nations Qualifier, a 6–0 win over Lesotho.
Bennacer was called up on 11 January 2017 to Algeria's squad for the African Cup of Nations of
2017 to replace Saphir Taïder, who suffered an injury in training.

At the 2019 Africa Cup of Nations, Bennacer helped Algeria to their first title in 29 years, finishing the competition as the joint-top assist provider, alongside Franck Kessié, with three assists, including one for Baghdad Bounedjah's match-winning goal against Senegal in the final on 19 July. He was later voted both the "Best Young Player" and the "Best Player" of the tournament.

Style of play
A dynamic, tenacious, energetic, diminutive, and versatile left-footed player, who is regarded as a highly promising prospect in modern football, Bennacer is capable of playing in several midfield roles, and has been used as a deep-lying playmaker in a holding role in midfield, as an attacking midfielder, or as a central offensive-minded midfielder, known as the mezzala role in Italian football. His main characteristics are his speed, vision, intelligence, composure, dribbling skills, passing, and technique; he is also known for his ability to transition from defence into attack.

Personal life
Bennacer was born in Arles, France to a Moroccan father and an Algerian mother.

Career statistics

Club

International

Scores and results list Algeria's goal tally first.

Honours
Empoli
 Serie B: 2017–18

AC Milan
Serie A: 2021–22

Algeria
 Africa Cup of Nations: 2019

Individual
 Best Player of the Africa Cup of Nations: 2019
 CAF Africa Cup of Nations Team of the Tournament: 2019

References

External links

 Profile at the AC Milan website
 
 
 
 
 

1997 births
2017 Africa Cup of Nations players
2019 Africa Cup of Nations players
2021 Africa Cup of Nations players
AC Arlésien players
Arsenal F.C. players
Tours FC players
Empoli F.C. players
A.C. Milan players
Algerian expatriate footballers
Algerian expatriate sportspeople in England
Algerian expatriate sportspeople in Italy
Algerian footballers
Algeria international footballers
Algerian people of Moroccan descent
Association football midfielders
Championnat National 3 players
Expatriate footballers in England
Expatriate footballers in Italy
French footballers
France youth international footballers
French expatriate footballers
French expatriate sportspeople in England
French sportspeople of Algerian descent
French sportspeople of Moroccan descent
Ligue 2 players
Living people
Moroccan footballers
Moroccan people of Algerian descent
Citizens of Morocco through descent
Moroccan expatriate footballers
Moroccan expatriate sportspeople in England
Moroccan expatriate sportspeople in Italy
People from Arles
Serie A players
Serie B players
Sportspeople from Bouches-du-Rhône
Footballers from Provence-Alpes-Côte d'Azur